"Finest Thing" is a song recorded by Lisa Stansfield's band, Blue Zone. It was written by Stansfield, Ian Devaney and Andy Morris, and produced by Blue Zone, Chris Porter and Pete Wingfield. The single was released in the United Kingdom and Germany in June 1986. "Finest Thing" was remixed by Nick Martinelli.

Track listings
German/UK 7" single
"Finest Thing" – 4:20
"Love Will Wait" – 4:20

German/UK 12" single
"Finest Thing" (Extended Version) – 6:30
"Finest Thing" (7" Version) – 4:20
"Love Will Wait" (Extended Version) – 6:46

UK 12" single (Remix)
"Finest Thing" (U.S. Remix) – 6:00
"Finest Thing" (Instrumental Dub) – 5:10
"Love Will Wait" – 4:20

References

1986 songs
1986 singles
Blue Zone (band) songs
Songs written by Lisa Stansfield
Arista Records singles
Songs written by Ian Devaney
Songs written by Andy Morris (musician)
Song recordings produced by Pete Wingfield